McBrayer is an unincorporated community in Anderson County, Kentucky, United States.

Notes

Unincorporated communities in Anderson County, Kentucky
Unincorporated communities in Kentucky